Marina Vasilyevna Gnatenko (12 March 1914 — 13 April 2006) was a sugarbeet farmer, Stakhanovite, Hero of Socialist Labor, and politician. She held posts in the Congresses of Communist Party of Ukraine, the Supreme Soviet of the Ukrainian SSR (1938 to 1947), and the Supreme Soviet of the USSR (1946 to 1950).

References

1914 births
2006 deaths
Soviet politicians
Recipients of the Order of Bohdan Khmelnytsky, 3rd class
Heroes of Socialist Labour
Second convocation members of the Supreme Soviet of the Soviet Union
First convocation members of the Verkhovna Rada of the Ukrainian Soviet Socialist Republic